Attilio Bertolucci (18 November 1911 – 14 June 2000) was an Italian poet and writer. He was father to film directors Bernardo and Giuseppe Bertolucci.

Biography
Bertolucci was born at San Lazzaro (province of Parma), to a family of agricultural bourgeoisie.

He began to write poems very early. In 1928 he collaborated with the Gazzetta di Parma, where his friend Cesare Zavattini was editor-in-chief. The following year Bertolucci published his first poetical collection, Sirio.

In 1931 he started studying law at the University of Parma, which however he left soon afterwards in favour of artistic and literary studies. In the following year his work Fuochi di Novembre gained him the praise of Italian poets such as Eugenio Montale.

In 1951 he moved to Rome. His marriage to Ninetta Giovanardi had given him two sons, Bernardo (1941–2018) and Giuseppe (1947–2012), both future film directors. In 1951 he also published La capanna indiana and won the Viareggio Prize for literature. In this period he cemented a friendship with Pier Paolo Pasolini.

Viaggio d'inverno ("Winter Voyage") of 1971 is one of Bertolucci's finest works. This work saw a noteworthy change of style in Bertolucci's poetry: while the first works were, according to Franco Fortini, characterized by "the choice of a humble language for pastoral situations", Viaggio d'inverno was more complex and was marked by an unsureness of feelings. From 1975, together with Enzo Siciliano and Alberto Moravia, he directed the literary review Nuovi Argomenti. He won another Viareggio Prize for the narrative poem Camera da letto (1984–1988).

His last work was La lucertola di Casarola (1997), a collection of works from his youth and other unpublished poems.

Bertolucci died in Rome in 2000.

Selections of his poetry has been translated into English by Charles Tomlinson and Allen Prowle.

Bibliography
Sirio (1929)
Fuochi di novembre (1932)
La capanna indiana (1951)
The bedroom (La camera da letto, 1988, English translation by Luigi Bonaffini); 
Viaggio d'inverno (1971)
La camera da letto (2 vols., 1984–1988, poem-novel)
Aritmie (1991, essays)
Verso le sorgenti del cinghio (1993)
Una lunga amicizia (1994, letters)
La lucertola di Casarola (1997)
"Sunshine and Shadows" (2010, English translations by Allen Prowle)

Honour 
 : Knight Grand Cross of the Order of Merit of the Italian Republic (2 May 1996)

References

External links
Two poems by Attilio Bertolucci

1911 births
2000 deaths
University of Parma alumni
Writers from the Province of Parma
Italian male poets
20th-century Italian poets
20th-century Italian male writers
Knights Grand Cross of the Order of Merit of the Italian Republic